The UEFA European Football Championship, commonly known as the UEFA European Championship and informally as the Euros, is the primary football competition contested by the senior men's national teams of the members of the Union of European Football Associations (UEFA), determining the continental champion of Europe. Held every four years since 1960, in the even-numbered year between World Cup tournaments, it was originally called the European Nations' Cup, changing to the current name in 1968.

History

Setanta Sports (2000–2004)

Coverage of the 2000 Euros was only available to Americans via pay-per-view. More specifically, via closed-circuit television, DirecTV, the DISH Network, and iNDemand cable pay-per-view. Viewers had the option of paying $20 per match, or $149 for the entire tournament. Setanta also charged bars $3,000 for the privilege to carry their coverage. This often meant a $20 cover charge. Fox Sports World did however, offer the rebroadcasts of games on a week-long delay.

Pay-per-view was still the primary option come the 2004 Euros. This time, the price for the entire tournament was worth $179 while the price for bars rose to $4,000. Five live games were however, broadcast on Fox Sports World and Fox Sports Espanol. All quarters and semis would be broadcast on a five-day tape delay, with the final airing on a three-day delay. According to Setanta CEO Michael O'Rourke, they we offered the events to ESPN and Fox Sports Net. Setanta even offered to pay them to put it on, but there just was no appetite.

ESPN/ABC (2008–2020)

ESPN first aired the UEFA Euros in 2008 after reached a agreement with UEFA in December 2006. With UEFA wanting the reverberations of the Euros to reach an international audience, ESPN decided to broadcast all matches live and online in 2008. After receiving good reaction from viewers, ESPN and UEFA continued to work by becoming official broadcasters of 2012, 2016 and 2020 tournament.

Distribution of match broadcasts 

 2008: ESPN (7 matches), ESPN2 (17 matches), ESPN Classic (5 matches), ABC (2 matches including final)
 2012: ESPN (22 matches including Final), ESPN2 (9 matches)
 2016: ESPN (39 matches including Final), ESPN2 (12 matches)
 2020: ESPN (40 matches including Final), ESPN2 (6 matches), ABC (5 matches)

Fox Sports (2024–present)
In 2021, Fox Sports outbid ESPN for the rights of Euro 2024 and Euro 2028.

On-air talent

Notes 

 The opening match of Euro 2016 between host France and Romania was switched to ESPN2 as ESPN aired the funeral of Muhammad Ali.

Spanish-language television

Euro 2012 
ESPN Deportes giving comprehensive coverage of the event with more than 6.5 live hours daily with 27 matches is shown live, and 4 tape-delayed matches (due to simulatenous group stage matches on last matchday). Jorge Ramos and Hernan Pereyra led the broadcast teams with the other is included: Fernando Palomo and Rafa Puente, and Ricardo Ortiz and José Antonio Noriega. José Ramón Fernández hosted studio coverage with analysts Andres Agulla, Jose Hernandez, Mario Kempes, Richard Mendez, Noriega, and Barak Fever. Reporters included Martin Ainstein, Vito De Palma, Alex de la Rosa.

Euro 2016 
ESPN Deportes airing 45 matches live, and six matches were tape-delayed (due to simulatenous group stage matches on last matchday). Fernando Palomo and José Antonio Noriega was the lead broadcast team. Other play-by-play announcers were: Ricardo Ortiz, Omar Orlando Salazar and Emilio Fernando Alonso. Color commentators: Mario Kempes, Roberto Gomez Junco, Ricardo Mayorga and Hernan Pereyra. Jorge Ramos leads studio coverage while Andres Agulla, Carolina Guillen and Tony Cherchi also presenting. Studio analysts were: Kempes, Mauro Camoranesi, Barak Fever, Richard Mendez, Ortiz, Alex Pareja, Pereyra, Rafael Puente del Rio and Jose del Valle. Martin Ainstein and Manu Martin are the reporters.

Euro 2020 
This event marked a new era for Spanish language broadcasts with Univision being selected as the official broadcaster. 40 matches will be broadcast and streamed on PrendeTV, Univision’s newly launched, ad-supported streaming service with the remaining 11 matches will airing on Univision and TUDN including the Turkey vs. Italy opening game at the Stadio Olimpico in Rome, both semifinals, and the final. Coverage is led by presenters Adriana Monsalve, Lindsay Casinelli, and Alejandro Berry who joined by numerous commentators, such as play-by-play Luis Omar Tapia, Paco Villa, José Luis López Salido, and José Hernández, and color commentators: Diego Balado, Iván Zamorano, Hristo Stoichkov, Tony Cherchi, Marc Crosas and Hugo Salcedo. Also contributing as studio analysts and co-commentators is former players Carles Puyol, Mauro Camoranesi, and Javier Zanetti. Daniel Chanona and Cristina Romero reporting on location from Europe.

See also
Sports broadcasting contracts in the United States#International competitions

References

External links
A brief history of the World Cup, European Championship and Copa America on US TV

ABC Sports
ESPN
ESPN2
Soccer on United States television
UEFA European Championship broadcasting rights
Fox Soccer original programming
History of sports broadcasting